Linhope is a small village in Northumberland, England.  It is located in the Cheviots on the River Breamish, and within Northumberland National Park.

Linhope Spout, a  waterfall that falls into a 16 ft plunge pool, is located on the Linhope Burn, a tributary of the Breamish, 1 km north of the village.

References

External links

GENUKI (Accessed: 20 November 2008)

Villages in Northumberland
Ingram, Northumberland